is a Japanese light novel series written by Myōjin Katō and illustrated by Sao Mizuno. It began serialization online in August 2017 on the user-generated novel publishing website Shōsetsuka ni Narō. It was later acquired by Fujimi Shobo, who have published the series since May 2018 under their Fujimi Fantasia Bunko imprint. The light novel is licensed in North America by Yen Press. A manga adaptation with art by Misuho Kotoba was serialized in Square Enix's seinen manga magazine Monthly Big Gangan from February 2019 to July 2022. The manga is licensed digitally in North America by Comikey. An anime television series adaptation by Silver Link and Blade aired from April to June 2022.

Characters

A reincarnated Demon Lord named Varvatos who existed 3,000 years prior to the start of the series.

An elf girl who is the first friend of Ard.

A young succubus who gets bullied a lot. She worships Ard after he comes to her rescue.

One of the Four Heavenly Kings and Varvatos's adopted sister.

The Demon Lord who defeated the Evil Gods and united the world. He chooses to reincarnate three thousand years into the future due to the loneliness brought about by his overwhelming power.

 

A former member of the Four Heavenly Kings. She is a magical scholar who works at the research institute in the ancient capital, Kingsglaive.

One of the Four Heavenly Kings. According to Ard, in power, he is the strongest member of the Heavenly Kings.

Media

Light novel
The light novel series is written by Myōjin Katō and illustrated by Sao Mizuno. It began serialization online in August 2017 on the user-generated novel publishing website Shōsetsuka ni Narō. It was later acquired by Fujimi Shobo, who have published ten volumes since May 2018 under their Fujimi Fantasia Bunko imprint. It is licensed in English by Yen Press.

Manga
A manga adaptation with art by Misuho Kotoba was serialized in Square Enix's seinen manga magazine Monthly Big Gangan from February 25, 2019 to July 25, 2022. Seven tankōbon volumes have been released as of September 2022. The manga is licensed digitally in North America by Comikey.

Anime
An anime adaptation was announced at the "Kadokawa Light Novel Expo 2020" event on March 6, 2021. The television series is produced by Silver Link and Blade and directed by Mirai Minato, with Michiko Yokote writing the series' scripts, Takayuki Noguchi adapting Sao Mizuno's character designs for animation, and Takeshi Nakatsuka composing the music. It aired from April 6 to June 22, 2022, on AT-X, Tokyo MX, BS NTV, KBS Kyoto, and SUN. The opening theme is "Be My Friend!!!" by Ayaka Ōhashi, while the ending theme is "reincarnation" by ChouCho. Crunchyroll licensed the series. Muse Communication licensed the series in South and Southeast Asia.

On April 11, 2022, Crunchyroll announced that the series will receive an English dub, which premiered on April 20.

References

External links
  at Shōsetsuka ni Narō 
  
  
  
 

2018 Japanese novels
2022 anime television series debuts
Anime and manga based on light novels
Crunchyroll anime
Demon novels
Fiction about reincarnation
Fujimi Fantasia Bunko
Gangan Comics manga
Isekai anime and manga
Isekai novels and light novels
Kadokawa Dwango franchises
Light novels
Light novels first published online
Muse Communication
School life in anime and manga
Seinen manga
Shōsetsuka ni Narō
Silver Link
Yen Press titles